Wezo Mbeli, the national scouting organization of the Comoros, was founded in 1975, and became a member of the World Organization of the Scout Movement in 1990. The coeducational Wezombeli has 1,725 members as of 2004. The development of Scouting has been hampered by civil unrest and lack of political stability in the country.

The Scout Motto is Uwe Tayari, Be Prepared in Swahili, and Sois Prêt, Be Prepared in French.

Organization
The Scout association has four sections: 
 Louveteaux (Cub Scouts)
 Scouts
 Scouts Aînés (Senior Scouts)
 Routiers (Rover Scouts).

The Routiers branch is open to boys and girls.

References

Scouting and Guiding in the Comoros
World Organization of the Scout Movement member organizations
Organizations established in 1975